The Dignity Coalition or Al Karama is an Islamist political party in Tunisia that was founded in 2019 in response to Ennahdha abandoning Islamism.

Election results

Parliamentary elections

Presidential elections

References

2019 establishments in Tunisia
Far-right politics in Africa
Islamic political parties in Tunisia
Political parties established in 2019
Political parties in Tunisia
Social conservative parties
Sunni Islamic political parties